Sir Æmilius Irving (February 4, 1823 – November 27, 1913) was a Canadian lawyer and politician.

Born in Leamington, England, son of The Hon. Jacob Æmilius Irving and Catherine, daughter of Sir Jere Homfray, of Llandaff House. He was educated at Upper Canada College, became a barrister in 1849, and was created a Queen's Counsel in 1863. In 1851, he married Augusta Gugy, the daughter of Bartholomew Conrad Augustus Gugy. He was a Liberal Member of the House of Commons of Canada for Hamilton in the 3rd Canadian Parliament. Irving served as clerk of the peace for Waterloo County and was Treasurer of the Law Society of Upper Canada from 1893 to 1913. He was knighted in 1906 and died in Toronto, Ontario in 1913.

References

External links
 
 The Law Society's Longest-Serving Treasurer: Sir Æmilius Irving Web article produced by the Law Society of Upper Canada Archives
 

1823 births
1913 deaths
Canadian Knights Bachelor
Liberal Party of Canada MPs
Members of the House of Commons of Canada from Ontario
Lawyers in Ontario
Canadian King's Counsel
Burials at St. James Cemetery, Toronto
People from Leamington Spa